Norway competed at the 1988 Winter Paralympics held in Innsbruck, Austria. In total athletes representing Norway won 25 gold medals, 21 silver medals and 14 bronze medals and the country finished in 1st place in the medal table.

Alpine skiing 

 Cato Zahl Pedersen won the gold medal in the Men's Downhill LW5/7 event
 Cato Zahl Pedersen won the gold medal in the Men's Giant Slalom LW5/7 event

Biathlon 

 Svein Lilleberg won the gold medal in the Men's 7.5 km LW4 event
 Svein Tore Fauskrud won the bronze medal in the Men's 7.5 km LW4 event

Cross-country skiing 

In total 29 medals were won in cross-country skiing.

Ice sledge speed racing 

In total 27 medals were won in ice sledge speed racing.

See also 
 Norway at the Paralympics
 Norway at the 1988 Summer Paralympics

References 

Norway at the Paralympics
1988 in Norwegian sport
Nations at the 1988 Winter Paralympics